Dokki (  , is one of nine districts that make up Giza city, which is part of Greater Cairo, in Egypt. Dokki is situated on the western bank of the Nile, directly across from Downtown Cairo. It is a vital residential and commercial district with major roads connecting the two parts of Greater Cairo (Cairo and Giza).

History 
Dokki used to be a village on a mostly royal and state-owned agricultural estate held under waqf (endowment) until the early 20th Century along with 'izbas (hamlets) such as Awlad 'Allam, Bein al-Sarayat and Dayr al-Nahya, surrounding the palace of princess Fatima, granddaughter of Khedieve Ismail. A renewed and expanded bridge and a real estate boom saw the land on Cairo's western bank being sold to property developers and subdivided into new suburban villa neighbourhoods. One of these companies was Société Anonyme Immobiliere des Terrains de Giza & Rodah which acquired the land around what is today Midan Finney, and after initial bankruptcy in 1910, started developing the land under new owner, Oswald Finney, in the 1930s. The Ministry of Awqaf was responsible for much of the urban sub-divisions in its northern part when its chief architect Mahmoud Riad planned  Madinat al-Awqaf in 1948.

These developments and hamlets made up most of the Wasat (middle) district in the city of Giza, before being divided in 1997 into the districts of Dokki (developments, hamlets and southern half of Madinat al-Awqaf, refletced in the names of the sub-districts, see Demographics below), and Agouza to the north with the northen half of Madinat al-Awqaf known colloquially today as Mohandessin.

A theory about its name is that the name originated from the Dokki family, which inhabited this region since ancient times and came to it from Upper Egypt and concentrated in it, then soon moved to the countryside in Menoufia.

Many Cairene landmarks  are located in Dokki, the German school Deutsche Evangelische Oberschule Kairo (DEO) and the embassies of many countries including Russia, Somalia, France, Chad, the Czech Republic, Pakistan, and Ethiopia. Dokki is home to approximately 56 foreign embassies, a number surpassed only by the Zamalek district. King Idris of Libya died at the Palace in Dokki in 1983.

Demographics and sub-districts 
In 2017, Dokki had a population of 70,926 people (35,750 male, 35,176 female).

It is sub-divided into six shiakhas as follows:

Education

The Dokki neighborhood is also called the "Schools District", where there are about 102 schools that represent all types of schools (government - private - experimental - languages). In addition to that, there is also [Deutsche Evangelische Oberschule]
The Deutsche Evangelische Oberschule is located in Dokki.
The Pakistan International School of Cairo was formerly in Dokki.

Transport

The Dokki district currently has 2 Cairo Metro stations (Bohooth & Dokki) both are parts of line 2.
In addition to that 1 station from the under development line 3 will be on the Gameat Al Dewal Al Arabeya street between Dokki and Mohandiseen district
Many public buses lines pass through it and it has a lot of station and on of the main working district for.

Business

Banks

Almost all banks in Egypt have one and or more than one branch in the Dokki district. For example El Ahli bank has around 5 branches in the Dokki.

Legal

Ibrachy & Dermarkar (1932)

Restaurants

The Dokki district contains varieties of food restaurant of different types:
1. for Shawerma there is Semsema, Naama, Shawerma Al Reem and many more.
2. almost all franchise american food have one or more than one branch there. for example McDonalds, Pizza hut, Papa John’s, WeinerWald, Domino’s Pizza and many more
3. Kebab restaurants: Radwan, Sheikh, Antar, Azma, Seikh mashwy and many more.
4. Kedba and sausage: for example Ezz El Menoufy.

The Dokki is a vital distract with many companies, schools, Embassies and banks.

See also
Mohandessin

References

External links

Districts of Giza